Nemophora karafutonis is a moth of the family Adelidae or fairy longhorn moths. It was described by Shōnen Matsumura in 1932. It is found in the Russian Far East and Japan.

The length of the forewings is 7–8.5 mm for males and 7–7.5 mm for females.

Subspecies
Nemophora karafutonis karafutonis
Nemophora karafutonis moriokensis (Okano, 1957)

References

Adelidae
Moths described in 1932
Moths of Japan
Moths of Asia